Koothattukulam is a town located in the south east of Ernakulam district in Moovatupuzha taluk. The area of ​​Koothattukulam Municipality, which shares the border with Kottayam and Idukki districts, is 2318.71 hectares. Population- 18970. 17 km from Muvattupuzha. It is 38 km from Kottayam by turning south. Moving to the northeast, M.C. Located on the road. The town is located 47 km south east of the district headquarters Ernakulam city.

The nearby panchayats of Koothattukulam, which was once a part of Kottayam district, are Palakkuzha, Tirumaradi, Veliyannur and Ilanji. A hill farming town, the people here are mainly small farmers. Major cash crops are rubber, paddy, coconut, saffron, ginger, turmeric, black pepper, vanilla, kacholam etc.

Four Brahmin families
It is believed that originally this area had been ruled by the four Brahmin families of Athiman Illom, Kottanadu, Kattimuttam and Pariyaram.

Territories
Today the Koothattukulam consists of the four distinct territories (locally known as ‘karas’) of Koothattukulam, Vadakara, Edayar and Kizhakombu and has a population of about 18,970.

Etymology from legends
There are interesting stories associated with the existing names of each area.This is a story about Koothattukulam, where once a woman dug a hole on a lonely hilltop, her weapon fell on the head of a strange idol. Immediately, blood started gushing from the statue's head, and the woman, who saw this, trembled with fear and it disturbed her mental state, and she, lost in the plain, wandered around the country. Thus this place which was known as 'Koothattakalam' later came to be known as Koothattukulam. The spot where the idol's blood was spilled came to be known as Chora Kuzhi ('Pool of Blood').

Annexation
In 1750, Marthandavarma made this region a part of Travancore. Until then, Koothatkulam was a part of a small princely state called Vadakkumkur. Vadakumkur kings used to change their capital all the time. Vaikam and Kadutururthi were at one point the capital of Vadakumkur. When Marthanda Varma subjugated Vadakumkur, Etumanur was the capital of Vadakumkur. In the war of Marthanda Varma, who subjugated the princely kingdoms, the bloodless transfer of power took place in the kingdom of Vadakumkur. The venue for this was Koothatkulam. The Vadakumkur army was relatively weak. Vadakumkur army did not have the capacity to face the forces of Travancore. Ramayan Dalava led the Travancore army to Vadakkumkur. Marthandavarma's greatest confidant. The brother of the king of Vadakkumkur deposed the king through fraud and the kingdom surrendered to Travancore. These movements took place in Koothatkulam. Travancore historical records say that the Travancore army under the leadership of Ramayan encamped at Koothatkulam. In order to save his life, the King of Vadakumkur sought refuge with the Kozhikode Samuthiri. Koothatkulam was the main production center of pepper at that time. Vadakumkur's main source of income was the pepper trade with the Dutch. This trade continued even after Travancore became part of the kingdom. At that time there were many pepper storage centers in the region.

History has it that Koothattukulam Mahadeva Temple was renovated and built with Ramayan Dalava during this period. This temple was under the king of Vadakumkur. The Travancore palace rebuilt this temple as an atonement for the wrong done to the king. This temple was built under the leadership of Ramayan Dalava by the sculptors of Suchindra and Padmanabha Puram. Historians have noted that the Travancore dynasty made amends to Vadakkamkur by renovating the Vaikam and Kattururthi Mahadeva temples, which are part of Vadakkumkur, and dedicating Ezharapponnana to the Etumanur Mahadeva temple. The Mahadeva temple at Koothattukulam, where the king was cheated, is also a part of the excellently built Ramayan Dalava. Then Dalava entrusted the management of this temple to the brothers of Suchindram. Later, Chennas Namboothiri, Vengacheri Moothat and Ambakat Panicker were given the right to own the temple. The Travancore records also state that the members of the Poti family named Atthiman of Mavelikara, which was the headquarters of the Ramayan, were entrusted with the responsibility of peace under the temple.

Koothatkulam was known as the agricultural trading center of Travancore since the time of Marthanda Varma. Then King Karthika Tirunal Rama Varma started many offices here. Authorized centers and check post for tax collection and inspection started in Koothatkulam. Koothattukulam is also called Rama Varma Puram in the records of that time. Even today the name of Koothattukulam Chanta in the records is Ramavarampuram

References- Travancore History- Dewan Peshkar P Shankunni Menon 1878

Travancore State Manual- V Nagam Ayah 1901 They had a weapons training centre at Oonakkur, and so, this place came to be known as ‘payattukalam’, which is the present-day Paittakkulam. It is believed that some members of the Keezhekkombil family who were experts in domesticating wild elephants came over from Elanji and settled over here, which is why the place came to be known as Kizhakombu.

Tenth Century
In the beginning of the tenth century, a group of devotees from Vatakara in Malabar set out for the church at Kuravilangad, carrying with them a statue (still disputed) of Yohannan Mamdana. On their way to Kuravilangad, these people rested at a place near Paittakulam and on account of this, the area was subsequently known as Vadakara.

Buddhist period
In his famous book ‘Keralathile Sthalacharithrangal’, the prominent historian and researcher V. V. K. Valath has pointed out that the cultural history of Koothattukulam dates back to the era of Buddhism and Jainism. Koothattukulam, thus, has an illustrious cultural history and the same is reflected in its very name, which suggests that this must have been a land of ‘kooth’ and ‘aattam’. Looking at the forays made by the current generation of this place into the arena of art and culture, such a guess is not too far off.

Administrative System
Even about 100 years back, establishments like a quasi-judicial court, hospital, sub-registrar’s office, police station, post office, rest house (circuit house), tourist bungalow, Devaswam Board office and an excise inspectorate, all of which normally form part of a District HQs set up, had been established here.

References

History of Ernakulam district